Luigi Ghirri (5 January 1943 – 14 February 1992) was an Italian artist and photographer whose work was about the relationship between fiction and reality. Ghirri has been the subject of numerous books. His works are held by various museums around the world and have been exhibited in the 2011 Venice Biennale and at MAXXI in Rome.

Life and work
Ghirri was born in Scandiano near Reggio Emilia, Italy, on 5 January 1943.

He started his career in the 1970s. Influenced by conceptual art, he created his first two series, Atlante (1973) and Kodachrome (1978), where his cropped images of the landscape were presented with a deadpan, often ironic wit and a continuous anthropological engagement with his surroundings. The compositions and hues of his photographs suggested subtle emotional tones and a meticulously rich way of viewing the world, as well as the role of images within it.

Ghirri's work quickly attracted international attention. In 1975 Time-Life included him in its list of the "Discoveries" of its annual Photography Year publication, and he showed at the Photography as Art, Art as Photography exhibition in Kassel. In 1982 he was invited to the photokina in Cologne, where he was acclaimed as one of the twenty most significant photographers of the 20th century for his series Topographie-Iconographie. In 1989 he made a series shot in the studio of painter Giorgio Morandi.

He died of a heart attack at the age of 49 in Roncocesi, Province of Reggio Emilia, Italy on 14 February 1992.

Publications
Kodachrome. Self-published / Punto e Virgola, 1978.
London: Mack, 2012. . With an essay by Francesco Zanot in Italian, English, French and German; and translations of the original texts in French and German.
Italian Landscape/Paesaggio Italiano (no.11 in the book series Lotus Documents directed by Pierluigi Nicolin), Hamburg: Gingko Press, 1989; Comprises 83 colour plates and 14 essays and interviews by Ghirri and various contributors. 128pp. 
Il Profilo Delle Nuvole. Immagini di un Paesaggio Italiano. Milan: Feltrinelli, 1996.
Atlante. Charta, 2000. .
Niente di antico sotto il sole. Torino: SEI, 1997; The Complete Essays. London: Mack, 2016. .
Luigi Ghirri. Tokyo: Taka Ishii, 2017. Text in English and Japanese.

Exhibitions

Solo exhibitions
 Luigi Ghirri, curated by Manfred Willmann, Fotogalerie im Forum Stadtpark, Graz, Austria, 1976.
Paesaggio Italiano (Italian Landscape), organised by the Assessorato alla Cultura del Comune di Reggio Emilia, Reggio Emilia, Italy, 1989.
It’s Beautiful Here, Isn’t It…, Aperture Foundation, New York City, 2008/09.
Kodachrome, Matthew Marks Gallery, New York City, 2013.
Luigi Ghirri ‘Thinking Images’ Icons, Landscapes, Architectures, MAXXI, Rome, 2013; Brazil; Reggio Emilia, Italy, 2014. A retrospective, curated by Francesca Fabiani, Laura Gasparini, and Giuliano Sergio.
The Map and the Territory (Cartes et Territoires), Museum Folkwang, Essen, 2018; Museo Reina Sofía, Madrid, 2018/19; Jeu de paume, Paris, 2019. Curated by James Lingwood.
Luigi Ghirri (non) luoghi, Palazzo Bisaccioni, Jesi, 2022.

Group exhibitions
Photography as Art, Art as Photography, Kassel, 1975.
ILLUMInations, Venice Biennale, Venice, Italy, 2011. Group exhibition, curated by Bice Curiger.
Luigi Ghirri/Aldo Rossi: Things Which Are Only Themselves, Canadian Centre for Architecture, Montreal, Canada, 1996. Curated by Paolo Costantini.
Photokina, Cologne, Germany, 1982.

Collections
Ghirri's work is held in the following permanent collections:
Stedelijk Museum, Amsterdam
, Milan, Italy
Bibliothèque nationale de France, Paris
Canadian Centre for Architecture, Montreal, Canada
Museum of Fine Arts, Houston, TX
Museum of Modern Art, New York City

See also
Piero Gemelli
Conceptualism
Franco Fontana
Gianni Celati
Paul Strand

References

External links
Archivio Luigi Ghirri
Galleria Valeria Bella

1943 births
1992 deaths
Italian photographers
Italian contemporary artists
People from the Province of Reggio Emilia